Rumbleverse was a free-to-play brawler battle royale video game developed by Iron Galaxy and published by Epic Games Publishing. The game was released for Windows via Epic Games Store, PlayStation 4, PlayStation 5, Xbox One and Xbox Series X/S on August 11, 2022. The servers shut down on February 28, 2023, six months after launch.

Gameplay
Rumbleverse was a battle royale game played from a third-person perspective. 40 players will be dropped into Grapital City or Low key key and they must fight against each other with the goal of being the last survivor. Unlike similar games in the market, Rumbleverse focuses on melee combat, and players have no access to any gun or firearm. Players have several base attacks, including punches, kicks, and elbow drops. Basic attacks can be blocked, while stronger attacks or in other words vicious attacks are unblockable and must be dodged instead.

At the beginning of a match, players must explore Grapital city or Low key key and collect magazines hidden inside boxes that can teach players special moves from special strikes all the way to unblockable vicious attacks, along with that players can use potions that increase the player's stats such as health, stamina and strength. Only a maximum of 10 potions can be used in solos, 8 in duos and finally a maximum of 6 in trios. Melee weapons, such as baseball bats and chairs, can be picked up and used as weapons against other opponents. Every building in the game is climbable, allowing players to quickly navigate through Grapital City and reach strategic positions while in a quick fight or in an intense endgame. Similar to other battle royale games, players must stay within a shrinking circle. When the player is outside the circle, a timer will begin counting down from 10. Players will be disqualified once the timer reaches zero. Iron Galaxy estimated that each match will last around 12–15 minutes.

Rumbleverse utilized a battle pass model. As players complete matches and progress in the game, they will earn Fame, which was considered xp in other games that gives random items everytime you level up in the fan mail leagues. Players can also purchase Brawlla Bills, another type of currency which can be purchased through microtransactions.

Development
The game was developed by Iron Galaxy. The studio, when developing Rumbleverse, drew from their experience working on live service games, as they were involved in porting Fortnite and The Elder Scrolls Online to consoles. The idea of developing a pro wrestling game first originated from Iron Galaxy's co-CEO Chelsea Blasko in October 2017. The idea led to the creation of the timer, which was considered to be "a convenient homage to the wrestling world" by the team. Traversal was considered to be an important gameplay pillar. Adam Boyes, the CEO of the studio, described it as "a very important, almost main character" for Rumbleverse, and added that players who are familiar with speedrunning and platform games such as Crash Bandicoot and Mario win a match most frequently as they understand how to navigate the map efficiently. The team believed that the lack of firearms in the game will compel players to change the tactics they usually use in other battle royale games, resulting in a different gameplay experience.

Rumbleverse was first announced at The Game Awards 2021 by Iron Galaxy and Epic Games Publishing. Initially set to be released on February 15, 2022, the game was delayed so that the development team can add more content. Rumbleverse was released for PC via the Epic Games Store, PlayStation 4, PlayStation 5, Xbox One and Xbox Series X and Series S on August 11, 2022. Several online playtesting sessions were held. The final season was released on November 16, 2022.

After originally being reported on January 30, 2023, Epic Games announced on January 31, 2023 that the game would be taken offline on February 28, 2023 and that all in-game purchases since launch would be eligible for a refund.

References

External links
 
2022 video games
Products and services discontinued in 2023
Free-to-play video games
Epic Games games
Battle royale games
Video games containing battle passes
Video games with cross-platform play
Windows games
PlayStation 4 games
PlayStation 5 games
Xbox One games
Xbox Series X and Series S games
Video games developed in the United States
Beat 'em ups
Multiplayer online games
Iron Galaxy games
Inactive multiplayer online games